Balazher  is a village in Zakarpattia Oblast (province) of western Ukraine.

Geography
The village is located around 7 km east of Berehove. Administratively, the village belongs to the Berehove Raion, Zakarpattia Oblast.

History
The first written mention of the village arose in 1323 as Balasey.

Population
In 2002, the population included  inhabitants 816, of whom 737 are Hungarians.

Villages in Berehove Raion